William Thrace "Square Jaw" Ramsey Jr. (October 20, 1920 – January 4, 2008) was an American professional baseball player who was an outfielder for the Boston Braves for a single Major League Baseball season in 1945.

Ramsey was born in Osceola, Arkansas.

On November 1, 1944, he had been drafted by the Boston Braves from the St. Louis Cardinals in the 1944 rule 5 draft.  Ramsey was one of many ballplayers who only appeared in the major leagues during World War II.  He made his major league debut on April 19, 1945, against the New York Giants at Braves Field.  Besides his outfield duties he was often used as a pinch-hitter.  In a total of 78 games he hit .292 (40-for-137) with 1 home run, 12 runs batted in, 16 runs scored, and a slugging percentage of .372.

He died at Kirby Pines Manor in Memphis, Tennessee, on January 4, 2008, and was buried at Elmwood Cemetery in Memphis.

Trivia 

Ramsey's nickname was "Square Jaw."
His tombstone lists his birth date as 20 February 1920

See also 

 Florida Gators
 List of Florida Gators baseball players

References

External links 
 Baseball Reference
 Retrosheet

1920 births
2008 deaths
Asheville Tourists players
Baseball players from Arkansas
Beaumont Roughnecks players
Boston Braves players
Charleston Senators players
Columbus Red Birds players
Dayton Ducks players
Dover Orioles players
Florida Gators baseball players
Fremont Green Sox players
Grand Rapids Colts players
Kansas City Blues (baseball) players
Major League Baseball left fielders
People from Osceola, Arkansas
Sacramento Solons players
St. Augustine Saints players
Seattle Rainiers players
Superior Blues players
Toledo Mud Hens players